Byron Black and Grant Connell were the defending champions, but did not participate this year.

Karsten Braasch and Michael Stich won the title, defeating David Adams and Marius Barnard 7–6, 6–3 in the final.

Seeds

  Jacco Eltingh /  Paul Haarhuis (first round)
  Yevgeny Kafelnikov /  Daniel Vacek (first round)
  Martin Damm /  Pavel Vízner (quarterfinals)
  Byron Talbot /  Jeff Tarango (quarterfinals)

Draw

Draw

External links
Draw

1997 Gerry Weber Open